is a Japanese manga series written and illustrated by Takatoshi Yamada. It was serialized in Shogakukan's Weekly Young Sunday from 2000 until the magazine's demise in 2008, at which point it moved to Big Comic Original. Shogakukan has compiled its chapters into 25 tankōbon volumes as of June 2010. The series was adapted as a Japanese television drama series which aired between 2003 and 2006 on Fuji TV.

In 2004, the manga won the 49th Shogakukan Manga Award for the General category.

Characters

A young, prominent surgeon, who left a prestigious hospital in Tokyo and moved to an isolated island in the southern part of Japan.  He works at a clinic there as the only doctor on the island. He was not necessarily welcomed by the islanders first as they had negative experience with former doctors at the clinic. But with his sincere attitude toward the patients and commitment to his work, Kensuke gradually developed good rapport with his patients. "Koto", his nickname, was given to him by a child who met him while on the ferry that took him to the island.

Nurse at Dr. Koto's clinic

A staff member at the clinic

The leader of the fishermen on the island

A boy who respects Dr. Goto and wants to be a doctor

Fisherman and Takehiro's father.

A worker at the Town Office

Media

Manga
Dr. Kotō Shinryōjo is written and illustrated by Takatoshi Yamada. It was serialized in Shogakukan's Weekly Young Sunday from 2000 to 2008, when the magazine ceased its publication, and it was then transferred to Big Comic Original. The manga has been on hiatus since October 2010. In October 2017, Yamada posted on his Facebook that he planned to resume his work. Shogakukan has compiled its chapters into individual tankōbon volumes. The first volume was published on November 4, 2000. As of June 30, 2010, twenty-five volumes have been released.

Volume list

Drama
The manga was adapted into a Japanese television drama which aired for eleven episodes on Fuji TV from July 3 to September 11, 2003. It was filmed on the Japanese Archipelago island Yonaguni. A 2-episode special was broadcast on November 12 and 13, 2004. A second season aired for eleven episodes from October 12 to December 21, 2006.

Reception
In 2004, the manga won the 49th Shogakukan Manga Award in the General category.

References

External links

2000 manga
2003 Japanese television series debuts
2006 Japanese television series endings
Fuji TV dramas
Japanese drama television series
Japanese medical television series
Japanese television dramas based on manga
Medical anime and manga
Seinen manga
Shogakukan manga
Winners of the Shogakukan Manga Award for general manga